Alonzo Bowen Hyndman (28 July 1890 – 9 April 1940) was a Canadian physician and politician. Hyndman was a Conservative and National Government member of the House of Commons of Canada. He was born in South Mountain, Ontario and became a physician by career.

He attended high school in Kemptville, Ontario, then Smiths Falls Collegiate. He studied at McGill University in Montreal where he attained his medical degree (MDCM) in 1915, then established a medical practice at Carp.

Hyndman was first elected to Parliament at Ontario's Carleton riding in the 1935 general election and re-elected there under the National Government party banner in 1940. Hyndman died suddenly on 9 April 1940, two weeks after the general election, before he was due to be sworn in for the 19th Canadian Parliament.

Electoral record

References

External links
 

1890 births
1940 deaths
Physicians from Ontario
Conservative Party of Canada (1867–1942) MPs
McGill University Faculty of Medicine alumni
Members of the House of Commons of Canada from Ontario
Politicians from Ottawa
People from the United Counties of Stormont, Dundas and Glengarry